This is a list of albums and singles released by singer Mitchel Musso. Musso has participated in many music ventures on June 2, 2009, and he released his self-titled debut under Walt Disney Records. He released his first extended play on November 22, 2010 titled Brainstorm. The EP is a Walmart exclusive.

Albums

Studio albums

Live albums

Extended plays

Singles

Promotional singles

Album appearances

References

Pop music discographies
Discographies of American artists